In clinical trials, reactogenicity is the capacity of a vaccine to produce common, "expected" adverse reactions, especially excessive immunological responses and associated signs and symptoms, including fever and sore arm at the injection site. Other manifestations of reactogenicity typically identified in such trials include bruising, redness, induration, and swelling.

Origin

The term reactogenicity was coined by the US Food and Drug Administration (FDA). All vaccines can induce reactogenicity, but reactogenicity is more likely in vaccines containing an adjuvant, which is a chemical additive intended for enhancing the recipient's immune response to the antigen that is present in a vaccine. Reactogenicity describes the immediate short-term reactions of a system to vaccines and should not be confused with the long-term consequences sequelae. Assessments of reactogenicity are carried out to evaluate the safety and usability of an experimental vaccine (see Investigational New Drug). It is unclear whether a higher degree of reactogenicity to a vaccine correlates with more severe adverse events, which would require hospitalization or are life-threatening. Adverse events have been linked to a higher degree of reactogenicity; however, the links might have been coincidental. After assessing large databases relating to these events for many years, the FDA has not been able to make such a correlation.

Definition

The US National Institutes of Health (NIH) has provided the following definition of reactogenicity:

See also
 Vaccine hesitancy

References

External links

 The how’s and what’s of vaccine reactogenicity, Nature (2019)

Vaccination
Food and Drug Administration
Drug safety